Vicente Aguirre was Argentine footballer, (January 22, 1901 - June 11, 1990), prominent in the history of Club Atlético Central Córdoba and Newell's Old Boys who also made four appearances for the Argentina national team in 1923-24.

Club career
In 1916, when he was fifteen years old, he started playing football in the lower divisions of Rosario Central. First he joined the team of the fourth division and then, in 1917, played in the team which won the third division tournament. In the final match that season, Aguirre scored two goals in the extra time that gave the team a 3:1 victory against Gimnasia y Esgrima.

In 1918, Aguirre transferred to Central Córdoba. He won the Rosarina Football Association championships with Central Córdoba and once in Newell's Old Boys. With the Charrúas he won the 1931 Preparation Tournament and the Governor Luciano Molinas Tournament in 1932, the first 2 official titles in the history of the club.

International career
As a player of the Argentinian team, he made 4 appearances for the National Team and scoring four goals, including a hat-trick in Montevideo (Copa América) in 1923, leading Argentina to a 4-3 win over Paraguay. Aguirre appeared in all three games for Argentina, who finished runners-up to Uruguay, at the 1923 Copa América.

Clubs
Rosario Central
Copa Nicasio Vila (1): 1917
Newell's Old Boys
Copa Estímulo de la Asociación Rosarina  (1): 1925
Central Córdoba
Torneo Preparación (1): 1931
Torneo Gobernador Luciano Molinas (1): 1932

Individual
 Copa América Top-scorer: 1923 with 3 goals.

References

External links
[https://www.rsssf.org/tables/23safull.html Southamerican Championship 1923 at rsssf
Blog Historia del futbol rosarino: Vicente Aguirre-Primera parte
Blog Historia del futbol rosarino: Vicente Aguirre-Segunda parte
Blog Historia del futbol rosarino: Vicente Aguirre-Tercera parte

1901 births
1990 deaths
Argentine footballers
Argentina international footballers
Central Córdoba de Rosario footballers
Association football forwards
Newell's Old Boys footballers
Rosario Central footballers
Footballers from Santa Fe, Argentina